Paul John Firmino Lusaka (10 January 1935 – 11 November 1996) was a Zambian politician and diplomat who became President of the United Nations General Assembly in 1984.

Life and politics
Lusaka was born in Moomba Village near Lusaka on 10 January 1935. He attended Roma University College in Lesotho where he obtained a degree in history and geography in 1959. The following year he was on an exchange programme that took him to the University of Minnesota funded by the Ford Foundation.

His 1963 Master's Degree in Political Geography was from McGill University in Montreal, Canada, and he was also trained in diplomacy by the Canadian United Nations contingent. In 1964 he was at the Zambian High Commission in London where he rose to the position of Deputy High Commissioner in 1965, which he held until 1968.

From 1968 he served as the Zambian Ambassador to Romania, Yugoslavia and Russia, until he left Russia to become a Permanent Representative at the UN in 1972 as well as a number of other diplomatic positions.

Between 1973 and 1978 he was a Member of Parliament in Zambia, where he held a number of ministerial positions.

The United Nations
In 1979  he became the Permanent Representative to the United Nations and as President of the United Nations Council for Namibia. He was vice president in 1980 and in the following year President of the Economic and Social Council. He was Zambia's chief representative at the Security Council in 1979 and 1980.

In 1985 the New York Times recorded that after a meeting with ten former U.N. Presidents he said,

Family
Lusaka was married and had nine children.

References

1935 births
1996 deaths
Zambian diplomats
University of Minnesota alumni
Members of the National Assembly of Zambia
Presidents of the United Nations General Assembly
Permanent Representatives of Zambia to the United Nations
Ambassadors of Zambia to the Soviet Union
Ambassadors of Zambia to Yugoslavia
Ambassadors of Zambia to Romania